Barling is a village and former civil parish, now in the civil parish of Barling Magna in Essex, England. The village is in the district of Rochford and in the parliamentary constituency of Rochford & Southend East. There is a Parish Council of Barling Magna. The village is served by one primary school, Barling Magna Primary Academy.

In 1961 the civil parish had a population of 1075. The parish of Barling Magna also includes the hamlets of Little Wakering and Stonebridge, and had a population of 1,657 according to the 2001 census, increasing to 1,740 at the 2011 census.

The word "Barling" is said to derive from two Saxon words "ban", a boar, and "ing", a meadow.

Barling is by Barlinghall Creek, a tributary of the River Roach.

In its agricultural setting, Barling village is mainly situated along Little Wakering Road, Church Road and Barling Road. Where these roads meet is the village duck pond.

Little Wakering
In the adjoining village of Little Wakering stands a terrace of 17th-century dormer cottages. Opposite is St Mary's Church, dating from the 11th century, but largely rebuilt by John Wakering, Bishop of Norwich from 1415-1425. In the tower are displayed the Royal Arms of George III.

Governance
Barling Magna Parish Council holds monthly public meetings. The nine parish councillors' responsibilities include the newly-refurbished Parish Hall at the junction of Little Wakering Road and Church Road, the Barling Magna Wildlife Reserve and local amenities, for example street-lighting. The Parish Council website carries local information as well as details of forthcoming council meetings. On 1 April 1946 the parish of Barling was abolished to form Barling Magna.

Barling is part of the electoral ward called Barling and Sutton. The population of this ward at the 2011 census was 1,876.

Gallery

References

External links 
 
 Aerial Video of Barling Hall Creek
 Barling Magna Parish Council official website

Villages in Essex
Former civil parishes in Essex
Rochford District